Chandrakona Jirat High School is one of the oldest schools of West Bengal. It is situated in Chandrakona of Paschim Medinipur, West Bengal, India. It was founded by the late Zamindar Jaykrishna Mukhopadhyay. Our school - Chandrakona Jirat High School is the second oldest institution of the district and celebrated its 150th Anniversary in 2006. Pandit Iswar chandra Vidyasagar visited this school in 1854. With his recommendation, the school was  affiliated as a Middle English school in 1856 and was upgraded to an  H.E. school in  1871. The School also upgraded as old H.S. school w.e.f. 1 January 1963 and new H.S. School with General Stream Course wef 1977. From class 5-12 is taught here. Class 5-10 are only boys but 11 and 12 are co-educational. It is at Gobindapur village of Chandrakona. Debi prasad Dubey was the Headmaster of this school for a long period of 36 years. Bikash Kumar Ghoshal, Present honourable Head Master of this school, assigned his charge on 23 May 2002. A large Infrastructural development of the school has been made during his tenure. He has been awarded "Avantika Award" and "National Education Achievement Award" from "Global Achievers’ Foundation", New Delhi for his book- Anirban Dipshikha-History of the School. He also has been nominated as one of 100 Top Educatos 2016 by International Biographical Centre, Cambridge, England. He has also been awarded "Inspiring Best Teacher Award" from UEM in 2017. Late Gopendra nath Das-the Hon'ble Justice of Calcutta High Court and the Administrator of West Bengal Board of Secondary Education in the 50s decade took his first lesson in this heritage school. The School has been awarded continuous seven times District level Prize (1st/2nd/3rd) in Youth Parliament Competition from 2008 to 2016.  The School has been felicitated by the Govt of W.B. for second position in YPC Division competition in 2014 and for First position in YPC Burdwan Division competition in 2015. It also has been awarded State level Prize in 2009. The School has been declared "District Champion" in Quiz contest in 2015 related to Gyan-O-Vigyan Mela organised by RMSA_Paschim Medinipur. School Magazine "Chayani" is published every year. One SC/ST hostel building was constructed in place of mud_walled building.

External links 

Chandrakona Jirat High School on facebook

High schools and secondary schools in West Bengal
Schools in Paschim Medinipur district
1856 establishments in India
Educational institutions established in 1856